Ancylis diminutana, the small festooned roller, is a moth of the family Tortricidae. It was described by Adrian Hardy Haworth in 1811. In Europe, it has been recorded from Great Britain, Ireland, the Benelux, Scandinavia, the Baltic region, Russia, Poland, the Czech Republic, Hungary, Romania, Slovenia and Switzerland. It is also found in North America.

The wingspan is 13–15 mm. Julius von Kennel provides a full description. Adults are on wing from May to August.

The larvae feed on Salix species, including Salix repens. They spin a leaf of their host plant, forming an enclosed pod or cone from inside which it feeds. Full-grown larvae spin a cocoon amongst the leaf litter in which it overwinters. Pupation takes place within this cocoon.

References

External links

Ancylis diminutana in UKmoths
Lepiforum.de

Moths described in 1811
Enarmoniini
Moths of Europe
Moths of North America
Taxa named by Adrian Hardy Haworth